"Breakfast Alone" is a song recorded by Canadian country music artist George Fox. It was released in 1993 as the third single from his fourth studio album, Mustang Heart. It peaked at number 10 on the RPM Country Tracks chart in September 1993.

Chart performance

References

1993 songs
1993 singles
George Fox songs
Warner Music Group singles
Songs written by George Fox (singer)
Songs written by Bob Gaudio
Song recordings produced by Bob Gaudio